Lord Frederick William Charles Nicholas Wentworth Hervey (26 November 1961 – 26 January 1998) was a British aristocrat and political activist. He was the second son of Victor Hervey, 6th Marquess of Bristol, but the only child by his second wife, the heiress Lady Juliet Wentworth-Fitzwilliam. As his elder half-brother was unmarried he was heir presumptive to the Marquessate. At Yale University, he founded the Rockingham Club, a society for aristocracy and royalty. He died in 1998.

Origins
Lord Nicholas's father was Victor Hervey, 6th Marquess of Bristol (1915–1985) of Ickworth House in Suffolk, a very wealthy aristocrat once described as "Mayfair's No. 1 Playboy," in a series of "life story" articles he wrote after serving a jail sentence for jewel robbery, a crime he claimed he had committed for a dare.

Lord Nicholas's mother, his father's second wife whom he had married in 1960 being her first husband, was Lady Juliet Wentworth-Fitzwilliam, the only child and sole heiress of the very wealthy Peter Wentworth-Fitzwilliam, 8th Earl Fitzwilliam (d.1948) who died in a small aircraft crash when she was aged 13. Also killed was his intended second wife, Kathleen Cavendish, Marchioness of Hartington, a daughter-in-law of the Duke of Devonshire and a sister of US President John F. Kennedy. Lady Juliet thus inherited her father's estate of estimated value £45 million, and later managed the family stud farm.

After his father's death in 1985 Lord Nicholas was thus the heir presumptive to the title and any entailed estates of the Marquess of Bristol after his unmarried and childless elder half-brother John Hervey, 7th Marquess of Bristol (1954–1999), who inherited in 1985, the only child of his father's first marriage. Nicholas and John were fond of one another. Nicholas was also the heir presumptive of the vast Fitzwilliam inheritance, through his mother.

When Nicholas was eleven years old, his mother divorced his father and remarried to his 60-year-old friend, Somerset de Chair (d. 1996) by whom five years later she had a daughter, Helena de chair, who in 2007 married Jacob Rees-Mogg. In 1996 his mother remarried for a third time and is now known as Lady Juliet Tadgell.

Nicholas's father also remarried, to his private secretary, Yvonne Sutton by whom he had three further children, Frederick Hervey, 8th Marquess of Bristol (born 1979), who inherited in 1999 and at whose Roman Catholic christening Nicholas had been a godfather, and two daughters Lady Victoria Hervey and Lady Isabella Hervey.

Education and clubs
Nicholas was known as a keen traditionalist. He was educated at Eton, Yale and the Royal Agricultural College, Cirencester.

Eton
At Eton he was "an industrious boy with plenty of initiative" who took part in the House debate and during his last two-halves (terms) was in the House Library (i.e., a house prefect), founded and was president of the Burlington Society, a fine arts society with an emphasis on modern art and was a member of the Agricultural and Political Societies. He left Eton at Christmas 1979 with A-levels in French, Spanish and Economics.

Yale
At Yale he took a degree in History of Art, requiring six years to graduate, which occurred in 1986. In 1981 whilst at Yale he founded the Rockingham Club, social club for descendants of royalty and aristocracy, which was later modified to allow membership to the children of the "super-wealthy".  The Club and Nicholas Hervey were profiled in Andy Warhol's Interview magazine but the club was dissolved shortly thereafter in 1986. Nicholas' older half-brother John, a homosexual, was posthumously reported to be a special friend of Andy Warhol. Nicholas was a member, through his mother, of the Turf Club, a London gentlemen's club connected to horse racing.

Monarchist League and politics

He was a leading member of the International Monarchist League.  He was elected President of its International Youth Association (under 21s) in February 1979 and recruited numerous new members. In 1985 he became a Vice-Chancellor of the League proper, and on 1 April 1986 made the formal toast to the guests Armin, Prince of Lippe and his wife at the League's Annual Dinner in the Cholmondeley Room of the House of Lords. In later years he allowed his membership and vice-chancellorship to lapse.

Through the League, which his father had subsidised for many years, he became friendly with Gregory Lauder-Frost, who introduced him to numerous right-wing conservative activities. One such event, on 25 September 1989, was the Western Goals Institute dinner at Simpson's-in-the-Strand, chaired by Lord Sudeley, for the President of El Salvador, Alfredo Cristiani, and his inner cabinet.

Illness, bankruptcy, and death
In 1983 Lord Nicholas was diagnosed with mild schizophrenia which was treated with medication. His mental health worsened when 
it was discovered that the principal heirs of the unentailed estate of his father, who had died in 1985, were not Nicholas and his elder brother, the latter who had however inherited Ickworth House and a large fortune, but rather his third wife and her young children. Nicholas and John launched a lawsuit to have the will overturned. In 1991 Nicholas voluntarily underwent treatment in a clinic and was forced to declare bankruptcy due to debts to his lawyers of £38,000 which his trustees refused to fund, His own mother, while on the Sunday Times Rich List (in 2003 her wealth was estimated at £45,000,000), did not act to prevent the bankruptcy, which appears to have triggered his entry into the clinic.  She subsequently declared that "he was never himself again" after the clinic stay.

Nicholas had severe depression and became increasingly reclusive. His landlady said that he "drew no shred of comfort from the high rank and great riches to which he was born" and that "he was a recluse, in the sense that he was heavily sedated and slept all day – a typical schizophrenic. He was very quiet, very Old Etonian. He was a nice guy, but very 'out of it'. Nobody visited him here, except sometimes we would hear someone come and take him out to dinner."

Lord Nicholas Hervey died on 26 January 1998 at the age of 36; the cause was suicide by hanging. He never married and had no children.

His half-brother, John Hervey, 7th Marquess of Bristol, died less than a year later, also unmarried and childless, having been a habitual heroin addict for many years.

References
Notes

Citations

Further reading
 Burke's Peerage, Baronetage and Knightage edited by Peter Townend, 105th edition, London, 1970.
 De-la-Noy, Michael. The House of Hervey. London, 2001. 
 Hervey, Lord Nicholas. The Monarchist League Today and its Role and Goals for the Future, in The Monarchist, July 1979, no. 55, UK
 — — The [Monarchist League] Youth Association Spreading its Wings, in The Monarchist, July 1981, no. 59, UK
 Iovine, Juli V. Lipsticks and Lords: Yale's New Look, in The Wall Street Journal, 4 August 1987, p. 1.
 Ray, Jonathan, Rake's Progress in the New Statesman, 30 October 2000, vol. 13, issue 629, p. 56.
 Utley, Tom, article on Hervey in The Daily Telegraph, London, 29 January 1998, (see also news item the previous day).

External links
 Bats in the family belfry: a review of The House of Hervey published in The Spectator, 12 May 2001

1961 births
1998 deaths
British monarchists
People educated at Eton College
Suicides by hanging in England
Younger sons of marquesses
Alumni of the Royal Agricultural University
Nicholas
People with schizophrenia
History of mental health in the United Kingdom
Royalty and nobility with disabilities
1998 suicides